Lake Hubert is a lake in Crow Wing County, in the U.S. state of Minnesota.

According to Warren Upham, Lake Hubert may have been named after Hubertus, the patron saint of hunters.

See also
List of lakes in Minnesota

References

Lakes of Minnesota
Lakes of Crow Wing County, Minnesota